The Changsha Bamboo Slips Museum is a history museum located at No. 92 of Baisha Road in Tianxin District, Changsha, Hunan, China. It is adjacent to Baisha Well in the south and Tianxin Pavilion in the west. Changsha Jiandu Museum is currently a large-scale modern themed museum dedicated to the collection, preservation, arrangement, study and exhibition of bamboo script (Jiandu). It is also an important spot of cultural and scenic interest and a window to showcase Changsha to the world.

History
The Changsha Bamboo Slips Museum was founded on 16 November 2002. Construction started in 2000 and completed in late 2003. November 8, 2007, it was officially opened to the public. In May 2009, it was authorized as a "Second Grade National Museum" by the State Administration of Cultural Heritage. In January 2017, it was designated as a "First Grade National Museum" by the State Administration of Cultural Heritage.

Collection
The collection of the museum includes bamboo scripts and historical artifacts from the Han Dynasty (206 BC–220 AD) and Three Kingdoms (220-280) periods: the Kingdom of Wu Annals (220–280) unearthed in Changsha's Zoumalou in 1996, the bamboo scripts of Western Han (206 BC-25 AD) unearthed from J8 Well in Zoumalou in 2003, the bamboo scripts and cultural relics unearthed from the Yuyang Tomb for one of the queens of Changsha Kingdom of the Western Han Dynasty in 1993, and a small number of exquisite cultural relics of later periods excavated from Changsha in the 21st century.

Access
The museum does not charge an admission fee.  It is closed on Tuesdays, and is open from 9:00 am to 17:00 pm daily.

Transportation
 Take bus No. 124 or 901 to the West Door of Tianxin Pavilion Bus Stop

Gallery

See also
 Zoumalou bamboo slips

References

External links

Tianxin District
Tourist attractions in Changsha
Buildings and structures in Changsha
Museums in Hunan
2002 establishments in China
Museums established in 2002
Bamboo and wooden slips
National first-grade museums of China